This is a list of Turkish Navy miscellaneous ships that have served past and present, from 10 July 1920 to present.

School ships 

 Mecidiye ( William Cramp & Sons, Philadelphia, Prut / Прут)
 Hamidiye ( (Sir W G Armstrong Whitworth & Co Ltd., Newcastle)

Ex- Type 401 (Rhein-class fast attack craft tender):
 TCG Cezayirli Gazi Hasan Paşa (A-579) (i) ex- A69 Donau
 TCG Cezayirli Gazi Hasan Paşa (A-579) (ii) ex- A61 Elbe

Ex- Type 402 (Mosel class fast minesweeper tender) 
  ex A54 Isar

Training boats 

 E-class training boat
 TCG E-1 (A-1531)
 TCG E-2 (A-1532)
 TCG E-3 (A-1533)
 TCG E-4 (A-1534)
 TCG E-5 (A-1535)
 TCG E-6 (A-1536)
 TCG E-7 (A-1537)
 TCG E-8 (A-1538)

Liquid fuel tankers 

 Çınar-class coastal tanker ( FW 1 class):
  ex FW-1
  ex FW-2
  ex FW-4
  ex 
  ex  Bodensee
 Van-class water tanker:
 
 
 
 
 Albay Hakkı Burak-class liquid fuel tanker:
 
 
 Akar-class fleet support ship:

Dry cargo ships 

 Karadeniz Ereğlisi-type dry cargo ship (Kanarya class):

Salvage ships 

 Akın-class  submarine rescue ship ( Chanticleer class):
  Ex-
 Alemdar-class  submarine rescue ship
 TCG Alemdar (A-582)
 Işın-class salvage ship ( Escape class)
  Ex-
 Kemer-class salvage assistance ship (Ex- Mercure class):
  Ex-West Germany M-1255 Passau

Tugs 

 Akbaş-class offshore tug (Ex- Almaz class):
 
 Kurtaran-class offshore tug (Ex- Penguin class submarine rescue ship):
  Ex-
 Gazal class (Ex- Navajo-class fleet tug):
  Ex-USS Sioux (ATF-75)
 Değirmendere-class offshore tug (Ex- Tenace class):
  Ex-French Centaure (A674)
 Darıca-class offshore tug:
 
 Aksaz-class offshore tug (Ex- Type 414 harbour tug):
 
 İnebolu-class offshore tug (Ex- Powhatan-class fleet ocean tug):
  Ex-

Net laying ships 

 
  ex- Aloe-class net laying ship:
  -  AN-103-class
  ex AN-103
  -  AN-93-class
  ex AN-93

Survey ships 

 Yunus-class electronic survey ship ( Type 422B class):
  ex-Alster
 Deney-class survey ship
 Çeşme-class hydrographic and oceanographic survey ship ( Silas Bent class):
 TCG Çeşme
 Çubuklu- class hydrographic and oceanographic survey ship

Repair ships 

  Ex- decommissioned 22 April 1993

Troop transport ship 

 İskenderun-class troop transport ship:

Sources

External links 
 Serhat Guvenc, "Building a Republican Navy in Turkey: 1924-1939", International Journal of Naval History
 Unofficial Homepage of Turkish Navy

Miscellaneous ships
Lists of ships of Turkey
Ships of the Turkish Navy